Mikkjal Danielsen (born 16 May 1960) is a retired Faroese football defender.

References

1960 births
Living people
Faroese footballers
Association football defenders
Faroe Islands international footballers